Burrewarra Point Light is an active lighthouse located at Burrewarra Point, New South Wales, Australia, which is north of Broulee and  to the south of Batemans Bay.

The light was constructed in 1974 as an automated lighthouse which was powered from batteries charged from the mains. In 1984 it was converted to solar power, with battery backup.

The light has no lantern.

Site operation and visiting
The lighthouse is operated by Transport for NSW. The site is open and accessible to the public, but the tower is closed.

See also

 List of lighthouses in Australia

Notes

References

External links

 Burrewarra Point Lighthouse at Grant and Tracey's Lighthouse Pages

Lighthouses completed in 1974
Lighthouses in New South Wales
1974 establishments in Australia